"Efter stormen" ("After the Storm") is a pop rock song written by Swedish singer-songwriter Marie Fredriksson and Record producer Lars-Göran "Lasse" Lindbom, released as the first and only commercial single from Fredriksson's third studio album, ... Efter stormen (1987). The song was issued on 7" vinyl exclusively in Sweden on 21 September 1987, with "Varmt och djupt" ("Warm and Deep") as its b-side, which would otherwise remain unreleased until the album was reissued on CD in 2002. A 12" vinyl edition of the single – limited to 330 copies and containing the same tracks as the 7" release – was also issued.

The song was commercially successful in her native country upon release, peaking at number seven and spending six weeks on the Swedish Singles Chart. Additionally, the song spent eighteen weeks on the Swedish Airplay Chart, peaking at number two for 5 consecutive weeks; it was held off the top spot every week by Gemini's "Mio min mio". The song also peaked at number four on Sveriges Radio's "Tracks" chart. In a 2018 online poll of Roxette fans, "Efter stormen" was dubbed the best song of Fredriksson's entire discography as a solo artist.

Track listing
All songs written by Marie Fredriksson and Lasse Lindbom.
 7" single 
 "Efter stormen" – 4:01
 "Varmt och djupt" – 4:33

Credits and personnel
Credits adapted from the liner notes of the original vinyl single.

Musicians
 Marie Fredriksson – vocals
 Per "Pelle" Andersson – drums
 Staffan Astner – electric guitars
 Richard "Ricky" Johansson – bass guitar
 Leif Larson – keyboards
 Per Malmstedt – keyboards and synthesizer
 Tove Naess – backing vocals
 Ki Rydberg – backing vocals

Technical personnel
 Peter Dahl – mastering
 Kjell Andersson – sleeve design
 Denise Grünstein – photography
 Alar Suurna – engineering

Charts

References

External links

1987 singles
1987 songs
Marie Fredriksson songs
Swedish-language songs
Swedish pop songs
Songs written by Marie Fredriksson
Songs written by Lasse Lindbom